Just Friends: Original Motion Picture Soundtrack is the musical accompaniment to the film of the same name. It was released November 22, 2005 on New Line Records.

Track listing
 Ben Lee - "Catch My Disease"
 Fountains of Wayne - "Hackensack"
 Rogue Wave - "Eyes"
 Samantha James - "Forgiveness"
 Brendan Benson - "Cold Hands (Warm Heart)"
 Robbers on High Street - "Big Winter"
 The Sights - "Waiting on a Friend"
 Reed Foehl - "When It Comes Around"
 The Lemonheads - "Into Your Arms"
 'Just Friends' Holiday Players - "Christmas, Christmas"
 Dusty 'Lee' Dinkleman" - "Jamie Smiles"
 Samantha James - "Love from Afar"
 Jeff Cardoni - "Just Friends Score Medley"
 All-4-One - "I Swear"

2005 soundtrack albums
Comedy film soundtracks
New Line Records soundtracks
Rock soundtracks